Alejandro Palacio is a Colombian musician and singer of vallenato music, actor and TV host. Palacio was one of the backup singers for the vallenato group Binomio de Oro de America who joined in 2004 after many singers passed through the musical group. Internationally, he is more known for his participacion acting in the telenovela Oye Bonita.

Early life
Alejandro Manuel Palacio Zawady was born on June 5, 1985. At the age of 8, Palacio knew how to play the guitar and started participating in several music festivals held in his native Santa Marta. At age 11 he began his vocal classes under the instruction of Judith Brassard, who had been a chorister for Celine Dion.

Career
In 2012, Palacio was chosen to star in Rafael Orozco, el ídolo, a Colombian biographical telenovela produced by Asier Aguilar Amuchastegui for Caracol Televisión, as the titular character. Based on the life of the Colombian singer of vallenato Rafael Orozco Maestre. Alejandro Palacio had stated many times that Rafael Orozco Maestre was his idol as he was growing up. The series follows the life of Rafael Orozco Maestre in his romantic moments and why he was killed.

Discography
Binomio de Oro de América
2004 - En todo su esplendor
2005 - Grafitti de amor
2006 - Impredecible

See also
Binomio de Oro de America

References

External links

1985 births
Living people
People from Santa Marta
Colombian musicians
Vallenato musicians
Sony Music Latin artists
Sony Music Colombia artists
Colombian songwriters
Male songwriters
Latin music songwriters